Captain Frederick Charles Booth VC, DCM (6 March 1890 – 14 September 1960) was a Rhodesian recipient of the Victoria Cross, the highest and most prestigious award for gallantry in the face of the enemy that can be awarded to British and Commonwealth forces.

Details
Booth was born in Holloway, North London, and educated at Cheltenham College. He served in the British South Africa Police in Southern Rhodesia from 1912 to 1917 and his regimental number was 1630. He was 26 years old, and a sergeant in the British South Africa Police attached to the Rhodesian Native Regiment during the First World War, when the following deed took place for which he was awarded the VC.

On 12 February 1917 in Johannes Bruck, German East Africa (now Tanzania), during an attack in thick scrub on an enemy position, Sergeant Booth went forward alone to rescue an injured man. He then rallied the poorly organised native troops and brought them to the firing line. On many previous occasions this NCO had set a splendid example of pluck, and endurance.

In 1918 he was commissioned into the Middlesex Regiment and in 1939 served with the Auxiliary Military Pioneer Corps.

Booth died on 14 September 1960 in Brighton, Sussex, England. He is buried at Bear Road Cemetery, Brighton, in the Red Cross Plot.

References

VC location

1890 births
1960 deaths
Rhodesian World War I recipients of the Victoria Cross
People educated at Cheltenham College
Recipients of the Distinguished Conduct Medal
People from Holloway, London
British South Africa Police officers
Middlesex Regiment officers
British colonial army soldiers
White Rhodesian people
Royal Pioneer Corps officers
British Army personnel of World War I
British Army personnel of World War II